Pseudochaete is a genus of green algae, in the family Chaetophoraceae.  However, this genus is not recognized by all authorities, sometimes being considered part of genus Stigeoclonium.

The name Pseudochaete, published by T. Wagner & M. Fischer in 2002, is also used for a genus of fungi belonging to the family Hymenochaetaceae and formerly part of genus Hymenochaete described by Léveillé.  According to Index Fungorum, the fungus name is illegitimate (and the algal genus has priority) but its use is widespread.

References

Chaetophorales genera
Chaetophoraceae